Harry K. Wong is an educator, educational speaker and author. His works include The First Days of School: How to Be an Effective Teacher and New Teacher Induction, as well as a variety of CD-Audio and DVD-format resources for teachers. The First Days of School has sold over 3.5 million copies and has had five editions printed. 
 
Wong's publications provide advice on the improvement of academic instruction, classroom management and teacher expectations of students. He draws a distinction between classroom "discipline" and classroom "management" and suggests that through clear procedures and routines, teachers can promote behaviors avoid infractions, punishments, and ultimately, lost productive time in a classroom.  He also asserted that the first few minutes with students on the first day can lead to the long-term success or failure of a teacher.

Wong's work has faced some criticism for its current relevance.  Criticism often cites that the management techniques in the book have become outdated, rely on supportive parents and administration, and call for punitive measures.

References

Wong, Harry; Wong, Rosemary. First Days of School: How to Be an Effective Teacher. Harry K. Wong Publications 2009.

Education writers
Living people
Year of birth missing (living people)